"O Arise, All You Sons" is the national anthem of Papua New Guinea. Adopted in 1975, it was written and composed by Thomas Shacklady.

History 
The National Identity Act of Papua New Guinea was formulated in 1971, motivating the country to create a national flag, a national emblem, a national pledge and a national anthem. A national flag and emblem were adopted in 1971. However, the national anthem remained undecided until independence from Australia in 1975, four years later. Although many songs were submitted to be the anthem, the National Executive Council decided a week before the country's Independence Day (10 September 1975), to adopt as the national anthem a composition that was composed by Chief Inspector Thomas Shacklady (1917–2006), a bandmaster of the Royal Papua New Guinea Constabulary Band.

During the 2015 Pacific Games opening ceremony, the anthem was sung with the first line altered from "O arise all you sons of this land" to "O arise sons and daughters of this land". An official later stated that this was illegal and a violation of the National Identity Act.

Lyrics

Notes

References

External links
National anthem of Papua New Guinea, MIDI file
Link to MP3 file
Thomas Shacklady – Composer of Papua New Guinea's National Anthem

National anthems
Papua New Guinean music
National symbols of Papua New Guinea
Oceanian anthems
National anthem compositions in B-flat major